John Cam Hobhouse, 1st Baron Broughton,  (27 June 1786 – 3 June 1869), known as Sir John Hobhouse, Bt, from 1831 to 1851, was an English politician and diarist.

Early life
Born at Redland near Bristol, Broughton was the eldest son of Sir Benjamin Hobhouse, 1st Baronet, and Charlotte, daughter of Samuel Cam. He was educated at Westminster School, and at Trinity College, Cambridge where he graduated in 1808. Broughton took the Hulsean prize in 1808 for his Essay on the Origin and Intention of Sacrifices. At Cambridge he founded the "Whig Club," and the "Amicable Society".

Friendship with Lord Byron and mainland European journeys
While at Cambridge Broughton became good friends with Lord Byron, who accompanied him on a tour in Spain, Greece and Turkey in 1809. Hobhouse was present at the Battle of Dresden in August 1813, and, following the Coalition armies into France, he saw Louis XVIII enter Paris in May 1814.

In 1815 Broughton was again in Paris after the return of Napoleon Bonaparte from Elba (see Hundred Days), and showed his dislike of the Bourbons and his sympathy with Bonaparte by writing in 1816 a pamphlet entitled The substance of some letters written by an Englishman resident in Paris during the last reign of the emperor Napoleon. This caused some offence in England and more in France, and the French translation was seized by the government and both translator and printer were imprisoned.

A further period of travel with Byron followed, and at this time Hobhouse wrote some notes to the fourth canto of Childe Harold. This canto was afterwards dedicated to him, and a revised edition of a part of his notes entitled Historical illustrations of the fourth canto of "Childe Harold" containing dissertations on the ruins of Rome and an essay on Italian literature, was published in 1818. He shared Byron's enthusiasm for the liberation of Greece; after the poet's death in 1824 he proved his will, and superintended the arrangements for his funeral.

Parliament
In February 1819 Hobhouse was the Radical candidate at a by-election for the representation of the City of Westminster, but he failed to secure election. He had already gained some popularity by writing in favour of reform, and in 1819 spoke the following words: "I am a man chosen for the people, by the people; and, if elected, I will do no other business than that of the people". In the same year (1819) he issued A defence of the People in reply to Lord Erskine's "Two Defences of the Whigs," followed by A trifling mistake in Thomas, Lord Erskine's recent preface. The House of Commons declared this latter pamphlet a breach of privilege; its author was arrested on 14 December 1819, and in spite of an appeal to the court of king's bench he remained in imprisoned in Newgate until the end of the following February.  However this proceeding only increased his popularity, and at the general election of 1820 he was returned for Westminster.

In parliament Hobhouse proved a valuable recruit to the Reform party, and is credited with the invention of the phrase His Majesty's (Loyal) Opposition made in 1826 during a speech in the House of Commons.

Having succeeded his father as 2nd baronet in 1831, Hobhouse was appointed secretary at war in the Whig administration of Lord Grey in February 1832, and was made a Privy Councillor. He effected some reforms and economies during his tenure of this office (He was responsible for the passing of the Vestry Act 1831), but, unable to carry out all his wishes.

Hobhouse became Chief Secretary for Ireland in March 1833. He had only held this post for a few weeks when, in consequence of his refusal to vote with the government against the abolition of the Doors and Windows Tax, he resigned both his office and his seat in parliament. At the subsequent election he was defeated.

Hobhouse joined the cabinet as First Commissioner of Woods and Forests when Lord Melbourne became Prime Minister in July 1834, and about the same time Hobhouse was returned at a by-election as one of the members for Nottingham. In Melbourne's government of 1835 he was President of the Board of Control, in which position he strongly supported the Indian policy of Lord Auckland. He returned to the same office in July 1846 as a member of Lord John Russell's cabinet.

In February 1851 Hobhouse went to the House of Lords as Baron Broughton, of Broughton-de-Gyfford in the County of Wiltshire. He left office when Russell resigned in February 1852.

Later life
In 1852 Hobhouse was also made a Knight Grand Cross of the Order of the Bath (GCB), and took little part in political life, being mainly occupied in literary pursuits and in correspondence. Lord Broughton was a partner in Whitbread's brewery, a fellow of the Royal Society, and one of the founders of the Royal Geographical Society.
In the opinion of the author of his biography in the Encyclopaedia Britannica (1911) he was a good classical scholar, and although not eloquent, an able debater.

Family
Lord Broughton married Lady Julia, daughter of George Hay, 7th Marquess of Tweeddale, in 1828. They had three daughters. Lady Julia died of tuberculosis in April 1835.

Hobhouse died in London on 3 June 1869, and being without heir male the barony lapsed on his death, the baronetcy passing to his nephew, Charles Parry Hobhouse.

Works
Hobhouse took the Hulsean prize in 1808 for his essay on the Origin and Intention of Sacrifices.

Hobhouse edited and published: 
 

Hobhouse wrote and published:
 
 

 
 

A collection of Hobhouse's diaries, correspondence and memoranda is in the British Museum.

Depiction in popular culture

Hobhouse was played by the character actor Raymond Lovell in the 1949 period drama The Bad Lord Byron.

Notes

References

Attribution:
 endnotes:
T. Moore, Life of Lord Byron (London, 1837–1840);
Greville Memoirs (London, 1896); 
;
The Times, 4 June 1869;
Spencer Walpole, History of England (London, 1890).

External links

1786 births
1869 deaths
19th-century British writers
Politicians from Bristol
British Secretaries of State
Whig (British political party) MPs for English constituencies
Members of the Privy Council of the United Kingdom
Members of the Parliament of the United Kingdom for English constituencies
Lord Byron
People educated at Westminster School, London
Alumni of Trinity College, Cambridge
Barons in the Peerage of the United Kingdom
Fellows of the Royal Society
UK MPs 1820–1826
UK MPs 1826–1830
UK MPs 1830–1831
UK MPs 1831–1832
UK MPs 1832–1835
UK MPs 1835–1837
UK MPs 1837–1841
UK MPs 1841–1847
UK MPs 1847–1852
UK MPs who were granted peerages
British philhellenes
Knights Grand Cross of the Order of the Bath
Chief Secretaries for Ireland
Burials at Kensal Green Cemetery
John
British diarists
Peers of the United Kingdom created by Queen Victoria
Presidents of the Board of Control
Committee members of the Society for the Diffusion of Useful Knowledge